Aspidontus tractus is a species of combtooth blenny found in coral reefs in the western Indian Ocean. It reaches the length of  TL. It mimics Labroides dimidiatus, the cleaner wrasse, and feeds on the fins of fish that mistake it for the cleaner wrasse. Eggs are laid in clusters below the surface.

References

tractus
Fish described in 1903